A crab cake is a variety of fishcake popular in the United States. It is composed of crab meat and various other ingredients, such as bread crumbs, mayonnaise, mustard (typically prepared mustard, but sometimes mustard powder), eggs, and seasonings. The cake is then sautéed, baked, grilled, deep fried, or broiled. Crab cakes are traditionally associated with the area surrounding the Chesapeake Bay, in particular the states of Maryland and Virginia. Although the earliest use of the term "crab cake" is commonly believed to date to Crosby Gaige's 1939 publication New York World's Fair Cook Book in which they are described as "Baltimore crab cakes," earlier usages can be found such as in Thomas J. Murrey's book Cookery with a Chafing Dish published in 1891.

Crab cakes are particularly popular along the coast of the Mid-Atlantic and South Atlantic states, where the crabbing industry thrives. They can also be commonly found in New England, the Gulf Coast, the Pacific Northwest, and the Northern California coast. While meat from any species of crab may be used, the blue crab, whose native habitat includes the Chesapeake Bay, is the traditional choice and generally considered to be the best tasting. In the Pacific Northwest and northern California, the Dungeness crab is a popular ingredient for crab cakes, and the cakes are prepared at many restaurants throughout the region.

Sides

The sides are usually french fries, coleslaw, potato salad, or macaroni salad. Restaurants serve crab cakes with a lemon wedge and saltine crackers and sometimes with other condiments such as a remoulade, tartar sauce, mustard, cocktail sauce, ketchup, or Worcestershire sauce. Many restaurants give their patrons the choice of having their crab cake fried or broiled. Crab cakes vary in size, from no bigger than a small cookie to larger than a hamburger.

Maryland crab cake
Crab cakes in Maryland traditionally consist of no other ingredients than lump back-fin meat picked from steamed blue crabs, a very small amount of binder and maybe a spice with a significant tie to the state like Old Bay. The ingredients are formed into cakes and cooled in a refrigerator for a period of time allowing them to firm up. This is done to minimize the amount of binder needed to hold them together during the cooking process. The cold cakes are then heated for a short time through either the frying or broiling method. 

Many restaurants and fish markets outside of the state of Maryland advertise their crab cake product as "Maryland Crab Cake" or "Maryland-Style" even though they are often made in a manner inconsistent with Maryland tradition. They may include many other ingredients that result in a lower percentage of crab meat being used along with a different taste. They may also substitute  crab meat of the cheaper portunus pelagicus(blue swimmer) for that of the callinectes sapidus(blue crab) species native to the Chesapeake Bay. The foreign product is often harvested using methods and practices considered unsustainable in the United States, where the crabbing industry is carefully regulated to ensure sustainability.

See also

References

External links

Nutritional Analysis at FoodsDatabase

Crab dishes
New England cuisine
Maryland cuisine
Cuisine of Baltimore
Cuisine of the Mid-Atlantic states
Cuisine of the Southern United States
Cuisine of the Western United States
Virginia cuisine
American seafood dishes